Henry Carey may refer to:

Henry Carey, 1st Baron Hunsdon (1526–1596), politician, general, and potential illegitimate son of Henry VIII
Henry Carey, 1st Earl of Dover (1580–1666), English peer
Henry Carey, 2nd Earl of Monmouth (1596–1661), English nobleman
Henry Carey (died 1581), MP for Buckingham and Berwick-upon-Tweed
Henry Carey (writer) (1687–1743), dramatist and songwriter
Henry Charles Carey (1793–1879), American economist
Henry Ernest Carey (1874–1964), British-born Australian public servant

See also
Henry Cary (disambiguation) 
Harry Carey (disambiguation)
Harry Caray (1914–1998), broadcaster